Mount Copeland is a summit in the Monashee Mountains to the northwest of Revelstoke, British Columbia, Canada.  It was named in 1939, along with Copeland Creek (aka Wildgoose Creek) and Copeland Ridge, of which it is the summit, for Ralph Copeland (1837-1905), an English astronomer and the third Astronomer Royal for Scotland.

Climate

Based on the Köppen climate classification, Mount Copeland is located in a subarctic climate zone with cold, snowy winters, and mild summers. Winter temperatures can drop below −20 °C with wind chill factors below −30 °C.

Record snowfall
Mount Copeland is the site of the highest recorded snowfall in Canada in one season (July 1, 1971-June 30,1972).

See also
Weather extremes in Canada
2010 British Columbia avalanche

References

External links
 Mount Copeland: Weather forecast

Copeland
Columbia Country
Copeland
Kootenay Land District